"Shades of Cool" is a song by American singer-songwriter Lana Del Rey, taken from her third studio album, Ultraviolence (2014). It was written by Del Rey and Rick Nowels, and produced by Dan Auerbach. The song was released on May 26, 2014 by Interscope Records as the second single from Ultraviolence. Lyrically, the single talks about an "unfixable" man.

"Shades of Cool" received general acclaim from music critics, who praised its musical style. Commercially, the single peaked at number 79 on the US Billboard Hot 100 and entered the top 40 of a few record charts in Europe. A music video for "Shades of Cool" was directed by Jake Nava and was described as a film noir visual.

Composition

"Shades of Cool" was written by Del Rey and Rick Nowels, and produced by Dan Auerbach. Composed in the key of D minor, the song runs at a moderate slow tempo of 46 beats per minute. It was described as a waltz instrumented by "slow-burn" bassline, guitar, and string instruments; the track features a guitar solo delivered by Auerbach.  Del Rey's vocals span from A3 to B5. Her "operatic" soprano vocals blending with "trademark wailing vibrato" create a ghostly atmosphere on "Shades of Cool". Chris Coplan from Consequence of Sound described the song as "a slow and slightly gloomy ballad." Meanwhile, "Shades of Cool" was characterized as a "seeping, atmospheric" ballad that contrasts the more "pop-savvy swaggering 'West Coast'" by Billboards Colin Stutz. On the single, Del Rey sings about an "unfixable" man: "But you are unfixable / I can’t break through your world / ‘Cause you live in shades of cool / Your heart is unbreakable."

Reception 
"Shades of Cool" received positive reviews from music critics. Coplan of Consequence of Sound complimented the song for its "grace and sophistication". Saran Shetty of Slate called "Shades of Cool" "a beautiful, brooding return to form [for Del Rey]", and opined that the single would "fit perfectly" in a James Bond theme track. Likewise, Rolling Stones Calyn Ganz wrote that the track "would be perfect for a James Bond film directed by Quentin Tarantino." Lathan Ryan from PopMatters positively compared Del Rey's vocals on "Shades of Cool" to those of Cocteau Twins vocalist Elizabeth Fraser, observing that "Del Rey has never sounded better".

The single peaked at number 79 on the US Billboard Hot 100. It managed to enter the top 40 of a few record charts: Belgian Wallonia (number 40), France (number 37), Hungary (number 19), and Spain (number 31). The single peaked at number three on the Greece Digital Songs, a chart operated by Billboard magazine.

Music video
The music video for "Shades of Cool" was directed by Jake Nava and was released on June 17, 2014. The video features tattoo artist Mark Mahoney, who also appeared in the music video for "West Coast", as Del Rey's love interest. Filmed in Los Angeles, California, the clip is a "romantic" visual depicting the streets of Los Angeles at night, a 1970s-themed neighborhood, and a pool. In the video, Del Rey dances for her love interest in "flowing" dresses. An alternative version of the visual for "Shades of Cool", which was also directed by Nava, was released in July 2014. This version, in which Del Rey is seen drowned in a pool, was described as "darker" than the original video.

Track listing
Digital download
"Shades of Cool" – 5:42

Credits and personnel
Credits adapted from the liner notes of Ultraviolence.

Performance credits
Lana Del Rey – vocals

Instruments

Dan Auerbach – electric guitar
Collin Dupuis – drum programming
Seth Kaufman – omnichord
Leon Michels – mellotron
Nick Movshon – bass guitar
Russ Pahl – electric guitar
Kenny Vaughan – electric guitar
Maximilian Weissenfeldt – drums

Technical and production

Dan Auerbach – production
John Davis – mastering
Collin Dupuis – engineering
Robert Orton – mixing

Charts

Certifications

Release history

References

External links

"Shades of Cool" lyrics at AllMusic

2010s ballads
2014 singles
2014 songs
Interscope Records singles
Lana Del Rey songs
Music videos directed by Jake Nava
Rock ballads
Song recordings produced by Dan Auerbach
Songs written by Lana Del Rey
Songs written by Rick Nowels